Ma Tin Tsuen is a walled village in Shap Pat Heung, Yuen Long District, Hong Kong.

Administration
Ma Tin Tsuen is a recognized village under the New Territories Small House Policy. It is one of the villages represented within the Shap Pat Heung Rural Committee. For electoral purposes, Ma Tin Tsuen is part of the Shap Pat Heung Central constituency, which was formerly represented by Willis Fong Ho-hin until July 2021.

Features
The entrance gate and the shrine of the walled villages were rebuilt in 2009.

Education
Ma Tin Tsuen is in Primary One Admission (POA) School Net 73. Within the school net are multiple aided schools (operated independently but funded with government money) and one government school: South Yuen Long Government Primary School (南元朗官立小學).

See also
 Walled villages of Hong Kong

References

External links

 Delineation of area of existing village Ma Tin (Shap Pat Heung) for election of resident representative (2019 to 2022)
 Antiquities Advisory Board. Picture of the Entrance Gate
 Antiquities Advisory Board. Picture of the shrine

Walled villages of Hong Kong
Shap Pat Heung
Villages in Yuen Long District, Hong Kong